Nifty Corporation, stylized as  and , is one of the leading internet service providers in Japan, and a subsidiary of Fujitsu. The company was the largest online service provider, Nifty Serve, in Japan. With the spread of the Internet, it started internet service in 1996. In 1999, it absorbed Fujitsu's ISP, InfoWeb. In 2006, the online service was closed due to a decline in users. The company went public in December 2006.

References

Companies based in Tokyo
Fujitsu subsidiaries
Internet service providers of Japan
Internet technology companies of Japan